The 1993–94 Saint Louis Billikens men's basketball team represented Saint Louis University in the 1993–94 NCAA Division I men's basketball season. The Billikens were led by head coach Charlie Spoonhour who was in his second season at Saint Louis. The team played their home games at St. Louis Arena and were a member of the Great Midwest Conference. The Billikens finished the season 23–6, 8–4 in GMC play to finish 2nd. They lost in the semifinal round of the GMC tournament, but received an at-large bid to the NCAA tournament as No. 7 seed in the Midwest region. The Billikens were defeated by No. 10 seed Maryland in the second round.

Roster

Schedule and results

|-
!colspan=9 style=| Regular season

|-
!colspan=9 style=| GMWC tournament

|-
!colspan=9 style=| NCAA tournament

Rankings

References

Saint Louis
Saint Louis Billikens men's basketball seasons
Saint Louis
Saint
Saint